Aşağı Seyidəhmədli (also, Ashaga Seyd-Akhmedly and Ashagy Seidakhmedli) is a village in the Fuzuli District of Azerbaijan.

References 

Populated places in Fuzuli District